Teymuraz Gabashvili was the defending champion, but chose not to defend his title.

Karen Khachanov won the title after defeating Rubén Ramírez Hidalgo 6–1, 6–7(6–8), 6–1 in the final.

Seeds

Draw

Finals

Top half

Bottom half

References
 Main Draw
 Qualifying Draw

2016 ATP Challenger Tour
2016 Singles